What Would Ryan Lochte Do? is an American reality television series on E! that debuted on April 21, 2013. The series chronicles the life of American competitive swimmer and Olympian Ryan Lochte as he prepares for the 2016 Summer Olympics while creating his fashion line, making media appearances, spending time with his family and friends as well as searching for the woman he can call his wife.

Episodes

Broadcast
In Australia, the series premiered from May 28, 2013 on E!.

References

2010s American reality television series
2013 American television series debuts
2013 American television series endings
English-language television shows
E! original programming